Route 303 is a short provincial route in New Brunswick, Canada that runs from Route 11 near Dugas to an intersection with Route 320 in Maisonnette.

Communities
 Dugas
 Village-des-Poirier
 Maisonnette

See also
List of New Brunswick provincial highways

References

New Brunswick provincial highways
Roads in Gloucester County, New Brunswick